Elsworth may refer to:

Elsworth, the UK village 
Elsworth (skipjack), the sailboat
David Elsworth, a horse trainer
Kate Elsworth, a musical artist
Margaret Elsworth, a charity worker
Scott Elsworth, a paralympian